Chris Gruler (born September 11, 1983) is an American former baseball pitcher. He was drafted by the Cincinnati Reds in the first round of the 2002 MLB Draft but never reached the major leagues because of injuries.

References

1983 births
Living people
Billings Mustangs players
Dayton Dragons players
Gulf Coast Reds players
Baseball players from Iowa
Sportspeople from Cedar Rapids, Iowa